Maulana Syed Hazrat alias Shodago Baba Ji (birth;  - 24 December 2021) was a Pakistani religious and spiritual leader. He belonged to Jowar, Buner District. He was one of the descendants of Pir Baba. He died on December 24, 2021, at the age of 109 in Charsadda. He had served Islam for 80 years. His students are present in different parts of Pakistan as well as Afghanistan and other countries.

Leading South African cricketer Hashim Amla was also a devotee of him. He accompanied Javed Afridi, owner of Peshawar Zalmi, to Charsadda and met Shodago Babaji.

Death 
He died on 24 December 2021 at the age of 109 in Charsadda. He was buried in his ancestral cemetery in the Shodago Sherpao area. The funeral prayer was attended by a large number of students from Khyber Pakhtunkhwa, Punjab and other parts of the country, leaders of political parties, locals and government officials. Khyber Pakhtunkhwa Chief Minister Mahmood Khan, Aftab Sherpao and others expressed grief over the death.

References 

1911 births
2021 deaths
Pakistani Islamic religious leaders
People from Buner District
People from Charsadda District, Pakistan
Pakistani centenarians
Men centenarians